Soong Fie Cho (born 5 January 1989) is a Malaysian badminton player. She won the 2015 Grand Prix Gold title at the Syed Modi International tournament in the women's doubles event partnered with Amelia Alicia Anscelly. She and Anscelly also won the gold medal at the 2015 Southeast Asian Games.

Achievements

Southeast Asian Games 
Women's doubles

BWF Grand Prix 
The BWF Grand Prix had two levels, the Grand Prix and Grand Prix Gold. It was a series of badminton tournaments sanctioned by the Badminton World Federation (BWF) and played between 2007 and 2017.

Women's doubles

  BWF Grand Prix Gold tournament
  BWF Grand Prix tournament

BWF International Challenge/Series 
Women's doubles

  BWF International Challenge tournament
  BWF International Series tournament

References

External links 
 
 

1988 births
Living people
People from Sabah
Malaysian sportspeople of Chinese descent
Malaysian female badminton players
Badminton players at the 2014 Asian Games
Asian Games competitors for Malaysia
Competitors at the 2015 Southeast Asian Games
Southeast Asian Games gold medalists for Malaysia
Southeast Asian Games silver medalists for Malaysia
Southeast Asian Games medalists in badminton
21st-century Malaysian women